Daule may refer to:

Locations in Ecuador
 Daule Canton
 Daule, Esmeraldas
 Daule, Guayas
 Daule River

Other
 Daule (meteorite)